Eamon Fullerton (born 19 March 1985) is a former Scottish professional footballer who played as a defender for Livingston, Raith Rovers, Kelty Hearts, Bo'ness United and Camelon.

Club career
Fullerton came through the Livingston youth system but did not make any first team appearances.  In early 2005, He had a short spell on loan at Raith Rovers, playing in 10 fixtures, before being released.

The defender spent the latter part of his career playing in the East Region Juniors with Kelty Hearts, Bo'ness United and Camelon.

Coaching career
Fullerton joined the coaching staff at Linlithgow Rose in August 2021.

References

1985 births
Living people
Scottish footballers
Scottish Football League players
Association football defenders
Livingston F.C. players
Raith Rovers F.C. players
Kelty Hearts F.C. players
Bo'ness United F.C. players
Camelon Juniors F.C. players
Scottish Junior Football Association players
Footballers from Falkirk (council area)
Linlithgow Rose F.C. non-playing staff